Powers Lake may refer to:
 Powers Lake (Georgia)
 Powers Lake (Meeker County, Minnesota)
 Powers Lake, North Dakota
 Powers Lake, Wisconsin
  Powers Lake, Connecticut